The In the Name of Love Tour is a concert tour by American recording artist, Diana Ross. The tour visited the Americas and Asia throughout 2013, 2014, 2015, 2016 and 2017.

Opening acts
Rhonda Ross Kendrick (select dates)
Evan Ross (Los Angeles)
Pentatonix (Los Angeles)
Naturally 7 (San Diego)

Set list
This set list was obtained from the February 6, 2015, concert at the Durham Performing Arts Center in Durham, North Carolina. It does not represent all concerts during the tour.

"I'm Coming Out"
"More Today Than Yesterday"
"My World Is Empty Without You" / "Baby Love" 
"Stop! In the Name of Love" 
"You Can't Hurry Love"
"Love Child"
"The Boss"
"Touch Me in the Morning"
"Upside Down"
"It's My House" / "Why Do Fools Fall in Love"
"Love Hangover" 
"Take Me Higher" 
"Ease on Down the Road"
"The Look of Love"
"Don't Explain" 
"Do You Know Where You're Going To"
"Ain't No Mountain High Enough"

Encore
"Reach Out and Touch (Somebody's Hand)"
"I Will Survive"

Tour dates

Festivals and other miscellaneous performances

This concert was a part of the "Curaçao North Sea Jazz Festival"
This concert was a part of "Music with Friends"
This concert was a part of the "Houston Children's Charities Gala"
This concert was a part of "The Concert for Children"
This concert was a part of the "Pacer's 32nd Annual Benefit"
This concert was a part of the "Montreal International Jazz Festival"
This concert was a part of the "26th Annual Bob Costas Benefit for SSM Cardinal Glennon Children's Medical Center"
This concert was a part of the "AMBI Benefit Gala" 
This concert was a part of "The Big Fresno Fair" 
This concert was a part of "Universal Studios' Mardi Gras"
This concert was a part of the "Aspen Music Festival"
This concert was a part of the "Britt Music & Arts Festival"
This concert was a part of the "Ravinia Festival"
This concert is a part of the "Essence Music Festival"

Cancellations and rescheduled shows

Box office score data

1Figures reported represents one of the two shows performed.

Commercial reception
2014: $6.2 million
2015: $10.3 million
2016: $5.9 million

References 

Diana Ross concert tours
2013 concert tours
2014 concert tours
2015 concert tours
2016 concert tours
2017 concert tours